James Garton (born 1887) was an English professional footballer who played as a forward.

Career
Garton played for Kettering Town and Bradford City.

For Bradford City he made 11 appearances in the Football League.

Sources

References

1887 births
Year of death missing
English footballers
Kettering Town F.C. players
Bradford City A.F.C. players
English Football League players
Association football forwards